The Ministry of Interior (MOI) is the government body charged with overseeing policing and border control in Iraq. The MOI comprises several agencies, including the Iraqi Police, Highway Patrol, Traffic Department, Emergency Response Unit, Explosive Ordnance Disposal Unit, and Department of Border Enforcement. Following passage of the Facilities Protection Service Reform Law, the Ministry absorbed FPS personnel previously spread among other ministries.  The MOI has approximately 380,430 employees, and the Ministry of Finance approved US$3.8 billion for its 2008 budget, representing a 21% growth over the previous year.

Under President Saddam Hussein, the ministry performed a wide range of functions, including keeping Iraq free of Hussein's enemies and others deemed "undesirable." When U.S.-led Coalition forces found and captured Hussein during the Iraq War, the ministry was not dissolved, unlike the defense ministry and intelligence agencies. Combined Joint Task Force 7 planned to hand over policing and internal security duties as soon as possible. Instead, the ministry was merely restructured.

Federal Police (FP)

The Federal Police (FP), sometimes called the National Police, is a gendarmerie-type paramilitary force designed to bridge the gap between the local police and the army. This allows the MOI to project power across provinces and maintain law and order, while an effective community police is developed. Although called police, the force has been trained primarily for military operations.

Amid frequent allegations of abuse and other illegal activities, in the fall of 2006 the Iraqi government decided to reform and retrain all FP units. The FP transformation yielded a police organization capable of performing criminal investigations as well as tactical operations, and included a reorganization that resulted in the replacement of two division headquarters with a federal police headquarters.

FP units are equipped with small arms, machine guns, pick-up trucks, and SUVs. The mechanized battalions are equipped with light armored vehicles.

Department of Border Enforcement (DBE)

The DBE is tasked with securing and protecting Iraq's international borders from unlawful entry of both personnel and materiel. The DBE mans 405 border structures. As of March 2010, the DBE has approximately 40,000 personnel assigned, organized into 5 regions, 12 brigades and 38 battalions. The DBE was headquartered in Baghdad.

In late January 2009, the 1st Region, DBE, controlled the northeastern parts of Iraq, where country shares borders with Syria, Turkey and Iran. The 1st Region, considered one of the safest areas of Iraq currently, contains cities like Irbil, Dahuk and Sulyamaniah. Mosul was in the 2nd Region, Diyala was in the 3rd Region, Bashrah is in the 4th Region and the cities of Nyjaf and Nakheb are in the 5th Region."

Law Maj. Gen. Fazladin Abdulqader Mohammed of Bamarni, Iraq, was the commander, 1st Region, DBE.
The 1st DBE Region "[had] the longest border of all the regions in Iraq," said Fazladin. "Our border covers from Fairozkan to Al Khabour, where the Tigris River Border Fort is located. It is 1,083 kilometers and we have three brigades for this region, the 1st Brigade, DBE, in Dahuk, 2nd Brigade, DBE, in Diyana and 3rd Brigade, DBE, in Sulyamaniah." All three of these brigades were made up of Kurdish Peshmerga.

In October 2009 the 9th Brigade DBE was responsible for the Iranian border, and the 11th Brigade, responsible for the Saudi border, in Muthanna Governorate.

The 15th DBE Brigade in Anbar Province was confirmed operational in January 2010.

Both the DBE and the Department of Ports of Entry (POE) were supposed to be equipped with AK-47s, medium machine guns, body armors, medium pick-up  trucks, mid-size Sport utility vehicles, generators and radios.

Seven DBE brigades in southern Iraq survived the ISIS onslaught of the northern summer of 2014, but five brigades based largely on the Syrian border were disbanded. (Knights, Long Haul, 9)

Facilities Protection Service
The Facilities Protection Service has more than 150,000 personnel who work for 26 ministries and eight independent directorates. Anecdotal evidence suggests that some of them are unreliable and responsible for violent crimes. Former Prime Minister Maliki announced a reform to consolidate all Facilities Protection Service personnel into a unified organization responsible to the MOI. , the Coalition no longer provided material or logistical support to the FPS.

Special Police Commandos

The Special Police Commandos were an elite counter-insurgency unit answering to the Ministry of the Interior. In June 2004, the CPA transferred sovereignty to the Iraqi Interim Government. Under the new Prime Minister, Ayad Allawi, the CPA appointed a new interior minister, Falah al-Naqib.

After the poor performance of the police in battles against Shiite cleric Muqtada al-Sadr's Mahdi Army, Al-Naqib sought to provide the MOI with effective Iraqi constabulary forces. Al-Naqib created “commando units” of former soldiers from elite units such as Saddam's Republican Guard. These units, commanded by al-Naqib's uncle, Adnan Thabit, a former army general, were personally loyal to the minister. The commandos were trained initially without U.S. involvement. They were under MOI control, and were outside the scope of the U.S. Civilian Police Assistance Training Team (CPATT) assistance program. The U.S. military provided arms and logistical support to these units, who proved to be effective under Minister al-Naqib's stewardship in fighting alongside U.S. forces against Sunni insurgents and Shiite militias. 
 
The existence of the unit was officially announced in September 2004 and numbered about 5,000 officers. Its principal U.S. adviser (Counselor) was Colonel James Steele, who also commanded the U.S. Military Advisory Group in El Salvador from 1984 through 1986.

The Special Police Commando Division, Public Order Division, and Mechanized Police Brigade were merged in 2006 to form the National Police. The National Police has since expanded and been renamed the Federal Police.

Bomb-detector controversy

On April 1, 2009, the Ministry of Interior was awarded the annual Pigasus Award by James Randi "For the funding organization that wasted the most money on pseudo-science... Iraq's Interior Ministry had, by the end of 2009, spent US$85,000,000 on a dowsing rod called the ADE 651. (Each individual unit cost up to $60,000.) Despite an international uproar and continual car bomb detonations in Iraq, the things are still being used, and the Ministry is still defending its decision to buy them [as of 2009]."

In 2010, the British businessman who exported the device was arrested by the British police for fraud.

, the ADE 651 is still in use at Iraqi checkpoints, with the Iraqi Police defending their use: "Don't listen to what people say about them or what reports media have on them. We would know best because we are the ones that are using them." Investigations by the BBC, U.S. Naval EOD Technology Division and other organizations have reported that these and similar devices are fraudulent and little more than "glorified dowsing rods" with no ability to perform claimed functions.

A New York Times report from October 2009 asserted "pervasive" corruption within the Ministry.

List of Interior Ministers

Interior Ministers, 2003–present

See also
Popular Mobilization Forces

Notes

External links
 

Interior
Iraq
Law enforcement in Iraq